Pituitary tumor-transforming gene 1 protein-interacting protein (PTTG1), also known as PTTG1-binding factor (PBF), is a poorly characterised protein that in humans is encoded by the PTTG1IP gene located within the chromosomal region 21q22.3.

Structure 

The encoded protein is composed of 180 amino acids and has a predicted molecular mass of 22kDa.  The peptide sequence shares no significant homology with any other human proteins but is highly conserved across a wide diversity of animal species, suggesting both unique function and evolutionary importance.  Initial protein prediction studies suggested that PTTG1IP was a cell surface glycoprotein, however, the recent identification of a nuclear localisation signal (NLS) suggests that it may have a role both in the cytoplasm and as a nuclear protein.

Function

Although PTTG1IP is ubiquitously expressed in normal human tissues, its exact function remains elusive.  It has been shown to directly interact with the human securin and proto-oncogene, PTTG1, thus facilitating its nuclear translocation and the subsequent transcriptional activation of basic fibroblast growth factor (bFGF) by PTTG1.

Further evidence suggests that PTTG1IP may have a direct role in cancer.  Initially, PTTG1IP expression was found to be higher in pituitary tumours compared with normal pituitary tissue.  In particular, PTTG1IP has been shown to regulate thyroid cell growth, with overexpression resulting in hyperplasia and the formation of lesions within the thyroid gland.  PTTG1IP expression has also been independently associated with tumour recurrence  and subcutaneous expression results in tumour formation in nude mice.

PTTG1IP is also implicated in breast cancer. Immunohistochemical analysis of tissue samples has revealed that PTTG1IP is strongly expressed in several types and grades of breast cancer. Furthermore, overexpression and secretion of PTTG1IP induces cell invasion, a process that is essential for the formation of metastatic disease.

Furthermore, PTTG1IP has been reported to regulate the expression of the human sodium-iodide symporter (NIS).  NIS is expressed by thyroid follicular epithelial cells and is responsible for iodine transport and uptake.  The ability of the thyroid to accumulate iodine provides the basis for radioiodine ablation of thyroid tumours and their metastases.  Overexpression of PTTG1 or PTTG1IP inhibits NIS mRNA expression and iodide uptake in human and rat thyroid cells. This has important implications for radioiodine ablation therapy and highlights PTTG1IP as a novel target for improving radioiodine uptake by thyroid tumours.

Interactions 

PTTG1IP has been shown to interact with:
PTTG1,
MCT8, and
NIS.

References

Further reading